Glenn Florio (January 26, 1967 – October 26, 2020) was an American rower. He competed in the men's double sculls event at the 1988 Summer Olympics.

He died of an apparent heart attack on October 26, 2020.

References

1967 births
2020 deaths
American male rowers
Olympic rowers of the United States
Rowers at the 1988 Summer Olympics